Mark John Hall II (born January 11, 1997) is an American freestyle wrestler and graduated folkstyle wrestler who currently competes at 86 kilograms. As a folkstyle wrestler, Hall was an NCAA Division I National champion (three-time finalist) and a three-time Big Ten Conference champion (four-time finalist) out of the Pennsylvania State University. As a freestyle wrestler, Hall was the 2021 US Open National champion, 2018 Pan American Continental champion, a two–time Junior World Champion and a Cadet World Champion.

Early life and school career

Middle and high school
Hall was born and grew up in Davison, Michigan, where he started wrestling at age six at Davison Middle School. He played soccer since he was 4 years old until he was 10 years old and attributes his quickness on the mat to his background. He started seventh grade in Davison Middle School, but ended up moving to Union, Kentucky to wrestle for Ryle High School. The move was originated because the MHSAA does not allow middle schoolers to compete in the varsity high school level, while the KHSAA does. In that year (2010), Hall compiled a 42–3 record and made it to the finals of the state championships at 119, where he finally lost to the defending state champion Myron Bradbury.

In 2011, Hall moved once again to wrestle at Apple Valley High School in Minnesota and decided to repeat 7th grade. He posted a 46–3 record as a seventh-grader and won a state title at 130 pounds. As an 8th-grader, he was unbeaten with a record of 43–0 and won his second state title now at 145 pounds. In his freshman year, he moved up another weight class and went on to win his third state title, this time at 152 pounds. As a sophomore, he moved up a weight class for the final time and went on to win his fourth state championship at 165 pounds, he also became a Cadet World Champion in freestyle wrestling. In his two remaining years (junior and senior) he won two more state titles at 165-pounds, making him a six-time Minnesota state champion and receiving the 2016 Dave Schultz High School Excellence Award. He also won the Junior World Championships and reached quarterfinals in the Olympic Team Trials in 2016 as a high school senior.

Hall posted a 278–5 record overall and is often considered the best Minnesota high school wrestler in history due to his accomplishments.

College career 
He enrolled with the Penn State Nittany Lions

2016–17 
At the beginning of the season, Hall was having a good redshirt season as he was 13–1 with seven pins, but he surpassed the expectations so much by comfortably winning the Southern Scuffle that PSUs Head Coach Cael Sanderson pulled his redshirt. As a true freshman, Hall went on to compete at the Big Ten Championships, where he posted a 2–1 record, making him the tournament's runner-up and qualifying for the nationals. At the national tournament, he defeated all 5 opponents, including top-ranked Zahid Valencia and #2-ranked Bo Jordan, making him the 2017 NCAA Division I Champion and receiving the InterMat Freshman of the Year Honor.

2017–18 
Posted an undefeated 24–0 record in regular season. Went on to win his first Big Ten title, defeated #6 ranked wrestler Myles Amine in the finals and qualified for the NCAA tournament. Advanced to his second-straight final at NCAAs, but ultimately lost to the top-ranked wrestler in the country Zahid Valencia, making him the 2018 NCAA Division I Runner-up at 174-pounds. After-season, Hall won a gold medal in the prestigious 2018 Pan American Championships in freestyle wrestling.

2018–19 
Compiled a perfect 23–0 record during regular season and avenged last year's loss at the National Finals beating Zahid Valencia 4 points to none. Won second-straight Big Ten title downing #4-ranked Myles Amine in the finals and qualifying for the 2019 NCAA Division I National Tournament. Got to the finals for the third-consecutive time defeating multiple high-ranked wrestlers, ultimately lost a close 4–3 to Zahid Valencia, making him the 2019 NCAA National Runner-up.

2019–20 
Hall recorded a 20–1 record during regular season. In the 2020 Big Ten Conference Championships, he went 3–0, remarkably downing #6-ranked Dylan Lydy and  avenging his loss in regular season by beating #2-ranked Michael Kemerer in the finals, winning his third-straight title. Going into the 2020 NCAA Wrestling Championships, Hall was seeded #1 and was a favorite to reach the finals for the fourth time and win the title a second time. However, due to the COVID-19 pandemic, the event wasn't able to take place, as it got cancelled. Hall wasn't able to finish his college career with an NCAA Title but was able to finish it with a Big Ten Championship in New Jersey. After the season, Hall earned All-American honors due to his performance throughout the season.

Overall, Hall was a one-time NCAA Champion, two-time NCAA finalist, four-time NCAA All-American, three-time Big Ten Champion and four-time Big Ten Finalist as a college wrestler.

Freestyle career

Age-group 
In the age-group, Hall was a two-time Junior World Champion and a Cadet World Champion in 2014, 2016 and 2017.

Senior level

2015-16 
After making his senior debut in 2015 with a third-place finish at the Grand Prix of Spain, Hall qualified for the 2016 US Olympic Team Trials after winning the Last Chance Qualifier at 74 kilograms, but lost in the second round to the US Open champion Andrew Howe. He then went on to defeat Iran's Ahmad Bazrighaleh in a charity match at the annual Beat The Streets event.

2018-20 
He made his return to the senior freestyle scene at the 2018 Pan American Championships, where he won the 74 kilograms championship and outscored his three opponents combined by 21 points to 1. In 2019, he once again won the Last Chance Qualifier now for the World Team Trials, but was stopped in his third match, this time by his collegiate rival Zahid Valencia.

Hall was then scheduled to wrestle Tommy Gantt on August 30, 2020 at Chael Sonnen's Wrestling Underground I. However, an injury forced him to pull out of the bout on August 27.

2021–2022 
After almost two years of inactivity, Hall eventually came back at the PRTC Summit I on January 31, but was defeated by '20 US National runner-up Nate Jackson in his comeback. Hall then competed at the 2021 America's Cup on February, compiling victories over two-time NCAA DI All-Americans Brett Pfarr and Josh Shields, '19 U23 World Team Member Muhamed McBryde and Christopher Foca.

Hall then wrestled at the prestigious Matteo Pellicone Ranking Series on March 7. Dominating his way to the finals, Hall earned a technical fall and two falls, including one after dismantling '20 Henri Deglane International and '16 NCAA champion Myles Martin. In the finale, he was dominantly stopped by his long-time rival Zahid Valencia, claiming silver.

On March 27, Hall competed at the US Last Chance Olympic Team Trials Qualifier, in his third attempt to claim the championship and advance to the US Olympic/World Team Trials. After three straight wins, Hall was once again defeated by Nate Jackson in the semifinals, losing his chance of qualifying for the Olympic Trials. Subsequently, he won his next match but was defeated in the third–place match by fellow NCAA champion Drew Foster to place fourth.

Hall competed at the US Open National Championships from May 1 to 2. The number one seed, he ran through the bracket with technical falls up until the finale, where he battled '21 NCAA runner–up Trent Hidlay, beating him on points and claiming the US Open Championship. Hall then avenged a loss from the US Last Chance OTT by tech'ing NCAA champion Drew Foster on June 18, at FCA: Truth & Technique.

To open up 2022, Hall competed at the prestigious Yasar Dogu International on February 27, but failed to place.

Personal life 
Hall holds a very close relationship with his father Mark Hall (senior), stating he always keeps him in the right path and is very grateful for it. His father, who was a state runner–up in 1976, also inspired him to wrestle along with his older brother and one of his former coaches. This coach was an accomplished wrestler in Chase Metcalf, Brent Metcalf's older brother, whom Hall was very close to and considered him an older brother or father and the person who pushed him the most while wrestling. When Hall was 8 years old, Metcalf died in an automobile accident, and that experience helped him to push himself more than ever. Hall still uses Metcalf's wrestling bag to this day.

Freestyle record

! colspan="7"| Senior Freestyle Matches
|-
!  Res.
!  Record
!  Opponent
!  Score
!  Date
!  Event
!  Location
|-
|Win
|35–8
|align=left| Myles Martin
|style="font-size:88%"|2–1
|style="font-size:88%"|March 16, 2022
|style="font-size:88%"|Rudis+: Snyder vs. Cox
|style="text-align:left;font-size:88%;"|
 Detroit, Michigan
|-
! style=background:white colspan=7 |
|-
|Loss
|34–8
|align=left| Tarzan Maisuradze
|style="font-size:88%"|5–8
|style="font-size:88%"|February 27, 2022
|style="font-size:88%"|2022 Yasar Dogu International
|style="text-align:left;font-size:88%;"|
 Istanbul, Turkey
|-
|Win
|34–7
|align=left| Drew Foster
|style="font-size:88%"|TF 12–2
|style="font-size:88%"|June 18, 2021
|style="font-size:88%"|FCA: Truth & Technique
|style="text-align:left;font-size:88%;"|
 Charlotte, North Carolina
|-
! style=background:white colspan=7 |
|-
|Win
|33–7
|align=left| Trent Hidlay
|style="font-size:88%"|5–4
|style="font-size:88%" rowspan=5|May 1–2, 2021
|style="font-size:88%" rowspan=5|2021 US Open National Championships
|style="text-align:left;font-size:88%;" rowspan=5| Coralville, Iowa
|-
|Win
|32–7
|align=left| Michael Battista
|style="font-size:88%"|TF 10–0
|-
|Win
|31–7
|align=left| Nick Reenan
|style="font-size:88%"|TF 11–0
|-
|Win
|30–7
|align=left| Joe Williams
|style="font-size:88%"|TF 10–0
|-
|Win
|29–7
|align=left| Job Ayala
|style="font-size:88%"|TF 10–0
|-
! style=background:white colspan=7 |
|-
|Loss
|28–7
|align=left| Drew Foster
|style="font-size:88%"|1–6
|style="font-size:88%" rowspan=6|March 27, 2021
|style="font-size:88%" rowspan=6|2020 US Last Chance Olympic Team Trials Qualifier
|style="text-align:left;font-size:88%;" rowspan=6|
 Forth Worth, Texas
|-
|Win
|28–6
|align=left| Taylor Lujan
|style="font-size:88%"|15–10
|-
|Loss
|27–6
|align=left| Nate Jackson
|style="font-size:88%"|1–3
|-
|Win
|27–5
|align=left| Devin Skatzka
|style="font-size:88%"|7–1
|-
|Win
|26–5
|align=left| Dalton Swayze
|style="font-size:88%"|TF 10–0
|-
|Win
|25–5
|align=left| Ramon Fry
|style="font-size:88%"|TF 11–0
|-
! style=background:white colspan=7 | 
|-
|Loss 
|24–5
|align=left| Zahid Valencia
|style="font-size:88%"|TF 0–11
|style="font-size:88%" rowspan=4|March 7, 2021
|style="font-size:88%" rowspan=4|Matteo Pellicone Ranking Series 2021
|style="text-align:left;font-size:88%;" rowspan=4|
 Rome, Italy
|-
|Win 
|24–4
|align=left| Clayton Pye
|style="font-size:88%"|Fall
|-
|Win 
|23–4
|align=left| Myles Martin
|style="font-size:88%"|Fall
|-
|Win 
|22–4
|align=left| Hunter Lee
|style="font-size:88%"|TF 11–0
|-
! style=background:white colspan=7 | 
|-
|Win
|21–4
|align=left| Christopher Foca
|style="font-size:88%"|4–3
|style="font-size:88%" rowspan=4|February 10–11, 2021
|style="font-size:88%" rowspan=4|2021 America's Cup
|style="text-align:left;font-size:88%;"rowspan=4|
 Concord, North Carolina
|-
|Win
|20–4
|align=left| Josh Shields
|style="font-size:88%"|5–2
|-
|Win
|19–4
|align=left| Muhamed McBryde
|style="font-size:88%"|TF 10–0
|-
|Win
|18–4
|align=left| Brett Pfarr
|style="font-size:88%"|6–2
|-
|Loss
|17–4
|align=left| Nate Jackson
|style="font-size:88%"|3–4
|style="font-size:88%"|January 31, 2021
|style="font-size:88%"|PRTC Summit I
|style="text-align:left;font-size:88%;"|
 Philadelphia, Pennsylvania
|-
! style=background:white colspan=7 |
|-
|Loss
|17–3
|align=left| Zahid Valencia
|style="font-size:88%"|0–5
|style="font-size:88%" rowspan=3|May 17–18, 2019
|style="font-size:88%" rowspan=3|2019 US World Team Trials Challenge Tournament
|style="text-align:left;font-size:88%;" rowspan=3|
 Raleigh, North Carolina
|-
|Win
|17–2
|align=left| Nick Becker
|style="font-size:88%"|6–4
|-
|Win
|16–2
|align=left| Ben Harvey
|style="font-size:88%"|TF 10–0
|-
! style=background:white colspan=7 |
|-
|Win
|15–2
|align=left| Chad Walsh
|style="font-size:88%"|TF 10–0
|style="font-size:88%" rowspan=3|May 5, 2019
|style="font-size:88%" rowspan=3|2019 US Last Chance World Team Trials Qualifier
|style="text-align:left;font-size:88%;" rowspan=3|
 East Stroudsburg, Pennsylvania
|-
|Win
|14–2
|align=left| Quint Eno
|style="font-size:88%"|TF 10–0
|-
|Win
|13–2
|align=left| Chad Haegele
|style="font-size:88%"|TF 10–0
|-
! style=background:white colspan=7 |
|-
|Win
|12–2
|align=left| Ethan Ramos
|style="font-size:88%"|6–0
|style="font-size:88%" rowspan=3|May 3–6, 2018
|style="font-size:88%" rowspan=3|2018 Pan American Continental Championships
|style="text-align:left;font-size:88%;" rowspan=3|
 Lima, Peru
|-
|Win
|11–2
|align=left| Santiago Martinez
|style="font-size:88%"|10–1
|-
|Win
|10–2
|align=left| Rashji Mackey
|style="font-size:88%"|5–0
|-
|Win
|9–2
|align=left| Ahmad Bazrighaleh
|style="font-size:88%"|8–5
|style="font-size:88%"|May 19, 2016
|style="font-size:88%"|2016 Beat The Streets: Time Square
|style="text-align:left;font-size:88%;"|
 New York City, New York
|-
! style=background:white colspan=7 |
|-
|Loss
|8–2
|align=left| Andrew Howe
|style="font-size:88%"|TF 0–10
|style="font-size:88%" rowspan=2|April 9, 2016
|style="font-size:88%" rowspan=2|2016 US Olympic Team Trials
|style="text-align:left;font-size:88%;" rowspan=2|
 Iowa City, Iowa
|-
|Win
|8–1
|align=left| Logan Massa
|style="font-size:88%"|13–11
|-
! style=background:white colspan=7 |
|-
|Win
|7–1
|align=left| Anthony Valencia
|style="font-size:88%"|5–4
|style="font-size:88%" rowspan=4|April 1–3, 2016
|style="font-size:88%" rowspan=4|2016 US Last Chance Olympic Team Trials Qualifier
|style="text-align:left;font-size:88%;" rowspan=4|
 Cedar Falls, Iowa
|-
|Win
|6–1
|align=left| Nestor Taffur
|style="font-size:88%"|10–6
|-
|Win
|5–1
|align=left| Santiago Martinez
|style="font-size:88%"|TF 18–8
|-
|Win
|4–1
|align=left| Thomas Domerese
|style="font-size:88%"|TF 10–0
|-
! style=background:white colspan=7 |
|-
|Win
|3–1
|align=left| Chris Laverick
|style="font-size:88%"|TF 10–0
|style="font-size:88%" rowspan=4|July 11, 2015
|style="font-size:88%" rowspan=4|2015 Grand Prix of Spain
|style="text-align:left;font-size:88%;" rowspan=4|
 Madrid, Spain
|-
|Win
|2–1
|align=left| Sergio Blanco
|style="font-size:88%"|TF 12–2
|-
|Loss
|1–1
|align=left| Carmelo Lumia
|style="font-size:88%"|3–4
|-
|Win
|1–0
|align=left| Alberto Martinez Navarro
|style="font-size:88%"|6–4
|-

NCAA Record

! colspan="8"| NCAA Championships Matches
|-
!  Res.
!  Record
!  Opponent
!  Score
!  Date
!  Event
|-
! style=background:white colspan=6 |2019 NCAA Championships  at 174 lbs
|-
|Loss
|13–2
|align=left|Zahid Valencia
|style="font-size:88%"|3–4
|style="font-size:88%" rowspan=5|March 23, 2019
|style="font-size:88%" rowspan=5|2019 NCAA Division I Wrestling Championships
|-
|Win
|13–1
|align=left|Myles Amine
|style="font-size:88%"|TB 2–1
|-
|Win
|12–1
|align=left|Taylor Lujan
|style="font-size:88%"|5–3
|-
|Win
|11–1
|align=left|Brandon Womack
|style="font-size:88%"|8–3
|-
|Win
|10–1
|align=left|Devin Kane
|style="font-size:88%"|MD 10–2
|-
! style=background:white colspan=6 |2018 NCAA Championships  at 174 lbs
|-
|Loss
|9–1
|align=left|Zahid Valencia
|style="font-size:88%"|2–8
|style="font-size:88%" rowspan=5|March 17, 2018
|style="font-size:88%" rowspan=5|2018 NCAA Division I Wrestling Championships
|-
|Win
|9–0
|align=left|Daniel Lewis 
|style="font-size:88%"|Fall
|-
|Win
|8–0
|align=left|Taylor Lujan
|style="font-size:88%"|6–2
|-
|Win
|7–0
|align=left|Dylan Lydy
|style="font-size:88%"|TF 21–3
|-
|Win
|6–0
|align=left|Austin Rose
|style="font-size:88%"|MD 12–2
|-
! style=background:white colspan=6 |2017 NCAA Championships  at 174 lbs
|-
|Win
|5–0
|align=left|Bo Jordan
|style="font-size:88%"|5–2
|style="font-size:88%" rowspan=5|March 18, 2017
|style="font-size:88%" rowspan=5|2017 NCAA Division I Wrestling Championships
|-
|Win
|4–0
|align=left|Zahid Valencia
|style="font-size:88%"|4–3
|-
|Win
|3–0
|align=left|Zach Epperly
|style="font-size:88%"|MD 10–2
|-
|Win
|2–0
|align=left|Jadaen Bernstein
|style="font-size:88%"|TF 16–0
|-
|Win
|1–0
|align=left|David Kocer
|style="font-size:88%"|8–2
|-

Stats 

!  Season
!  Year
!  School
!  Rank
!  Weigh Class
!  Record
!  Win
!  Bonus
|-
|2020
|Senior
|rowspan=4|Penn State University
|#1 (Nationals Cancelled)
|rowspan=4|174
|23-1
|96.00%
|72.00%
|-
|2019
|Junior
|#1 (2nd)
|30-1
|96.77%
|45.16%
|-
|2018
|Sophomore
|#2 (2nd)
|32-1
|96.97%
|69.70%
|-
|2017
|Freshman
|#3 (1st)
|31-3
|91.18%
|61.76%
|-
|colspan=5 bgcolor="LIGHTGREY"|Career
|bgcolor="LIGHTGREY"|116-6
|bgcolor="LIGHTGREY"|95.12%
|bgcolor="LIGHTGREY"|61.79%

Awards and honors 

2020
NCAA Division I First Team All-American (174 lbs)
 Big Ten Conference (174 lbs)
2019
 NCAA Division I (174 lbs)
 Big Ten Conference (174 lbs)
2018
 Pan American Championship (79 kg)
 NCAA Division I (174 lbs)
 Big Ten Conference (174 lbs)
2017
 NCAA Division I (174 lbs)
 Big Ten Conference (174 lbs)

References

External links 
 

Living people
1997 births
American male sport wrestlers
Apple Valley High School (Minnesota) alumni